Jack C. Nichols (1930 – 2007) was an American politician. He served as a Democratic member of the Florida House of Representatives.

In 1961, Nichols won the election for an office of the Florida House of Representatives, in which he served until 1962. He succeeded Charles D. Stewart and served along with James H. Wise. Nichols was succeeded by Maurice McLaughlin in November 1962.

References 

1930 births
2007 deaths
Democratic Party members of the Florida House of Representatives
20th-century American politicians